The 1958 Cork Senior Football Championship was the 70th staging of the Cork Senior Football Championship since its establishment by the Cork County Board in 1887. 

St. Finbarr's entered the championship as the defending champions.

On 28 September 1958, Macroom won the championship following a 1-07 to 0-09 defeat of Avondhu in the final. This was their 9th championship title overall and their first title since 1935.

Results

Final

Championship statistics

Miscellaneous

 Macroom win the title for the first time since 1935.
 Avondhu qualify for their first football final.

References

Cork Senior Football Championship